Banco Rugby Club, usually just Banco, is a rugby union club, located in the city of Mendoza, Argentina. The team is member of the Unión de Rugby de Cuyo and currently plays in the Torneo del Oeste league.

The club was founded in 1992 by a group of enthusiasts of the game. Club Banco Nación supported the creation of a team, so the recently created club took its name and colors as a tribute to the institution. Although women take part in many social activities at the club, they are not allowed to vote, so presidents can be elected only by male members.

References

External links
Official website 
Torneo del Oeste on Rugbytime.com 
Unión de Rugby de Cuyo clubs 
Rugby de Cuyo website 

Rugby clubs established in 1992
Sports teams in Mendoza Province
Argentine rugby union teams
1992 establishments in Argentina